Hopewell Area School District is a small, suburban public school district located in Beaver County, Pennsylvania, United States. It serves the townships of Hopewell, Raccoon, and Independence. According to 2000 federal census data, it serves a resident population of 19,453. In 2009, the district residents’ per capita income was $20,145, while the median family income was $53,197. In the commonwealth, the median family income was $49,501 and the United States median family income was $49,445, in 2010.

Schools
The district operates five schools.

Hopewell Elementary
Independence Elementary
Margaret Ross Elementary
Hopewell Memorial Junior High School
Hopewell High School

The district's facilities include an indoor pool which is made available to the public.

References

External links
 Hopewell Area School District

School districts in Beaver County, Pennsylvania